Foryd Pier railway station served the village of Kinmel Bay, known as Foryd at the time, in the historical county of Flintshire, Wales, from 1859 to 1885 on the Vale of Clwyd Railway.

History 
The station was opened in August 1859 by the Vale of Clwyd Railway. It didn't appear in the timetable. It was resited closer to the river mouth on 1 October 1865. It was intended to run trains to connect to the pier so passengers could take the steam ship to Liverpool. This never materialised as the station was hardly ever used, so it closed on 20 April 1885.

References 

Disused railway stations in Denbighshire
Railway stations in Great Britain opened in 1859
Railway stations in Great Britain closed in 1885
1859 establishments in Wales
1885 disestablishments in Wales